The University of Michigan Museum of Natural History is a natural history museum of the University of Michigan in Ann Arbor, Michigan, United States. 

A unit of the university's College of Literature, Science, and the Arts, the current building is located on the university's Central Campus and has 22,000 square feet of exhibit space in a building that it shares with three research museums (Anthropology, Zoology, Paleontology).  The University Herbarium is administered through the same organization. The natural history collections began in 1837, and for many years the museum was based in the Alexander Ruthven Museums Building, dating to 1928.  The public exhibit museum was founded in 1956, and today has more than 100,000 visitors annually.

The museum is a 501(c)(3) tax-exempt non-profit organization. It employs 11 full-time staff and between 40-50 paid student docents, and has an annual budget of more than $900,000.

The museum recently moved to a new location at 1105 North University Avenue, in the University of Michigan Biological Sciences Building. It opened in April 2019.

Exhibits
The museum has four major permanent exhibits:
 The Hall of Evolution on the second floor displays exhibits on evolution and prehistoric life, including  fossils, models, and dioramas of dinosaurs, ancient whales, mastodons, and other organisms. It is the largest collection on prehistoric life in Michigan.
 The Michigan Wildlife Gallery on the third floor displays exhibits on birds, mammals, reptiles, amphibians, plants, and fungi native to the Great Lakes. There are taxidermy specimens, exhibits on habitats, and displays about regional environmental problems. A mastodon trackway, the largest on display in the world, is part of this exhibit. 
 The Anthropology Displays feature exhibits on anthropology, and include artifacts from human cultures around the world.
 The Geology Displays on the fourth floor feature a collection of the several rocks and minerals.

Two galleries display exhibits on "Evolution & Health" and archaeological research work in the U-M Museum of Archaeological Anthropology. The first floor Rotunda Lobby currently displays "The Invisible World of Mites."

Gallery

References

External links
 Official website

Anthropology museums in the United States
Dinosaur museums in the United States
Geology museums in the United States
Historic district contributing properties in Michigan
Museums in Ann Arbor, Michigan
Museums on the National Register of Historic Places
Natural history museums in Michigan
National Register of Historic Places in Washtenaw County, Michigan
University museums in Michigan
University and college buildings on the National Register of Historic Places in Colorado
University of Michigan
University of Michigan campus
Science museums in Michigan
Planetaria in the United States